Rokhsana Fiaz  (born December 1971) is a Labour Party politician serving as Mayor of Newham.

Fiaz was elected as a Councillor for the Newham ward of Custom House in 2014. Ahead of the 2018 Mayoral election, following protracted disagreements within the local party, the incumbent Labour Mayor of Newham (and the first directly elected Mayor of Newham) Sir Robin Wales was not automatically re-selected as the Labour Party's candidate. In the open selection that followed, Fiaz defeated Wales for the Labour nomination by 861 votes to 503.

Fiaz was subsequently elected Mayor in May 2018, receiving 73.4% of the first preference votes (53,214 votes). She is the first directly elected female mayor for any London borough. 

Fiaz promised to hold a referendum on the direct elected mayoral system  and this took place in May 2021. Voters decided by 56% to 44% to retain the system. 

In the local elections of May 2022 Rokhsana Fiaz was returned as mayor for second term, securing 35,696 votes (56.2%).

Personal life
Fiaz was born in Mile End Hospital to parents who had moved to London from Pakistan in the 1960s. In 2009 she was awarded an OBE for services for race, faith and charity.

References

21st-century British politicians
British politicians of Pakistani descent
English people of Pakistani descent
Labour Party (UK) mayors
Living people
Mayors of places in Greater London
Officers of the Order of the British Empire
People from Mile End
Councillors in the London Borough of Newham
1971 births
Women councillors in England
Women mayors of places in England